Ashot Avedyan is an Iranian football forward who played for Iran. He also played for Docharkheh Savaran and Taj SC.

References

External links
 

Iranian footballers
Association football forwards
Iranian people of Armenian descent
Ethnic Armenian sportspeople
Esteghlal F.C. players
Year of birth missing
Iran international footballers